The Liberty Amendments: Restoring the American Republic is a book by the American talk radio host and lawyer Mark Levin, published in 2013.  In it, Levin lays out and makes a case for eleven Constitutional amendments which he believes would restore the Constitution’s chief components: federalism, republicanism, and limited government.

Summary 
The eleven amendments proposed by Levin:
 Impose Congressional term limits
 Repeal the Seventeenth Amendment, returning the election of Senators to state legislatures
 Impose term limits for Supreme Court Justices and restrict judicial review
 Require a balanced budget and limit federal spending and taxation
 Define a deadline to file taxes (one day before the next federal election)
 Subject federal departments and bureaucratic regulations to periodic reauthorization and review
 Create a more specific definition of the Commerce Clause
 Limit eminent domain powers
 Allow states to more easily amend the Constitution by bypassing Congress
 Create a process where two-thirds of the states can nullify federal laws
 Require photo ID to vote and limit early voting
Levin would have these amendments proposed to the states by a convention of the states as described in Article Five of the Constitution.

Reception
The book debuted at #1 on The New York Times Best Seller list in all three categories for which it qualified.

See also
 Proposed "Liberty" Amendment to the United States Constitution
 List of proposed amendments to the United States Constitution

References

2013 non-fiction books
Books about politics of the United States
Simon & Schuster books
United States constitutional commentary